Haslewood is a surname. Notable people with the surname include:

 Ashby Haslewood (1810–1876), English cleric and educationalist
 Joseph Haslewood (1769–1833), English writer and antiquarian